Rhyndaston is a rural locality in the local government area (LGA) of Southern Midlands in the Central LGA region of Tasmania. The 2016 census recorded a population of 71 for the state suburb of Rhyndaston.

History 
Rhyndaston was gazetted as a locality in 1974. 

Originally named Flat Top Hill, it was changed to Rhyndaston when a railway tunnel was built through the hill. It is believed to be a Welsh term for “mouth of the hole”, and was conferred by Charles Meredith, the Colonial Treasurer.

Geography
Most of the boundaries are survey lines.

Road infrastructure 
Route C313 (Rhyndaston Road) runs through from north to south.

References

Towns in Tasmania
Localities of Southern Midlands Council